The Codimex CD-6809 was an 8-bit home computer produced in Brazil by the company Codimex Imp.Exp. de Computadores Ltda from Porto Alegre. It was introduced in early 1983, during the Brazilian "Market Reserve" period, and based on the TRS-80 Color Computer.

The CD-6809 was the first Brazilian home computer compatible with the TRS-80 Color line. It was marketed as a computer for small business, entertainment and self employed professionals, and was sold with a 149-page user manual.

Around 380 units were produced  at the Porto Alegre plant. The machine can be emulated under MAME.

See also 

 Motorola 6809
 CP-400
 LZ Color 64
 TRS-80 Color Computer

References 

Computer-related introductions in 1983
Goods manufactured in Brazil
Personal computers
Products introduced in 1983
TRS-80 Color Computer